Katri Briitta Ilona Kulmuni (born 4 September 1987) is a Finnish politician who served as the 35th deputy prime minister of Finland and the leader of the Centre Party between 2019 and 2020. A member of the Centre Party, she has been a Member of Parliament since 2015.

Early life and education
Kulmuni graduated from the University of Lapland in 2018 with a Master of Social Science degree.

Political career
Kulmuni was elected to the Parliament of Finland in 2015 for the  Lapland constituency and reelected in 2019. After the 2019 elections, she was named the Minister of Economic Affairs in Antti Rinne's cabinet. 

On 7 September 2019, Kulmuni defeated Antti Kaikkonen in the leadership election of the Centre Party. Five days later, she succeeded Mika Lintilä as the Deputy Prime Minister of Finland. After the collapse of the Rinne Cabinet, Kulmuni became Minister of Finance in the Marin Cabinet.

On 5 June 2020, Kulmuni resigned as Minister of Finance and Deputy Prime Minister after it was revealed that she had been given media training at the cost of 56,203 euros, which was billed to her two ministries. Two days before the resignation announcement, she told media that she would repay the cost. On 8 June, former Prime Minister Matti Vanhanen was elected to succeed Kulmuni as Minister of Finance.

On 5 September 2020, Annika Saarikko replaced Kulmuni as the Leader of the Centre Party.

Other activities

European Union organizations
 European Investment Bank (EIB), Ex-Officio Member of the Board of Governors (2019–2020)
 European Stability Mechanism (ESM), Member of the Board of Governors (2019–2020)

International organizations
 Asian Infrastructure Investment Bank (AIIB), Ex-Officio Member of the Board of Governors (2019–2020)
 European Bank for Reconstruction and Development (EBRD), Ex-Officio Member of the Board of Governors (2019–2020)
 Nordic Investment Bank (NIB), Ex-Officio Member of the Board of Governors (2019–2020)
 World Bank, Ex-Officio Member of the Board of Governors (2019–2020)

Controversy
Shortly after her 2019 appointment as finance minister, Kulmuni caused controversy when she posted an informal Instagram poll on whether the government should allow Finnish women with links to Islamic State to return from Syria, or just their children. She deleted the post and apologized after criticism by Human Rights Watch.

References

External links
 Official website

1987 births
Living people
People from Tornio
Centre Party (Finland) politicians
Deputy Prime Ministers of Finland
Ministers of Finance of Finland
Government ministers of Finland
Members of the Parliament of Finland (2015–19)
Members of the Parliament of Finland (2019–23)
21st-century Finnish women politicians
Women members of the Parliament of Finland
Female finance ministers
Women government ministers of Finland
University of Lapland alumni